Neptunium arsenide is a binary inorganic compound of neptunium and arsenic with the chemical formula . The compound forms crystals.

Synthesis
Heating stoichiometric amounts of pure substances:

Physical properties
Neptunium arsenide forms crystals of several modifications:

Cubic system, space group Fm3m, cell parameters a = 0.5835 nm, exists at temperatures below –131 °С.
Tetragonal system, cell parameters a = 0.58312 nm, c = 0.58281 nm, exists in the temperature range –131 to –98 °С.
Cubic system, space group Fm3m, cell parameters a = 0.58318 nm, exists at temperatures above –98 °C.

Neptunium arsenide becomes antiferromagnetic at 175 °K.

References

Neptunium compounds
Arsenides
Rock salt crystal structure